Bülbülün Kanadı Sarı is a Turkish folkloric tune (Ağıt).Bülbülün Kanadı Sarı is a form of the Turkish folkloric tune Ağıt.The meter is .

Original form
The original form of the türkü was popular in Diyarbakır.

See also
Ağıt
Ağlama Yar Ağlama

References

Turkish songs
Year of song unknown
Songwriter unknown